Stanislovas "Stasys" Stonkus (29 December 1931 – 19 February 2012) was a Soviet and Lithuanian basketball player who competed for the Soviet Union in the 1952 Summer Olympics and in the 1956 Summer Olympics. He was born in Telšiai. In 1954, he graduated from the Lithuanian National Physical Education Institute. He trained at VSS Žalgiris in Kaunas.

He was a member of the Soviet team, which won the silver medal. He played one match. Four years later he won his second silver medal as part of the Soviet team. He defended his doctoral dissertation at Tartu University in 1974, and his Dr Habil. before the Joint Council in Moscow. After serving as rector of the Physical Education Institute (1978–1990), he was also vice-president of the Lithuanian Olympic Committee for four years (1992–1996). Stonkus has compiled a dictionary of sports terms in Lithuanian and has written several studies on sport.

References

External links
profile

1931 births
2012 deaths
Soviet men's basketball players
BC Žalgiris players
Olympic basketball players of the Soviet Union
Basketball players at the 1952 Summer Olympics
Basketball players at the 1956 Summer Olympics
Olympic silver medalists for the Soviet Union
FIBA EuroBasket-winning players
Olympic medalists in basketball
University of Tartu alumni
Lithuanian Sports University alumni
Medalists at the 1956 Summer Olympics
Medalists at the 1952 Summer Olympics